Underbelly is the side of something that is not normally seen. Figuratively, it means a vulnerable or weak part, similar to the term Achilles' heel, or alternatively, a hidden, illicit side of society.

This term could refer to:

Business 

 Underbelly Limited, an entertainment company in the UK
 Underbelly (venue), an entertainment venue in the UK

Television

Australia and New Zealand
 Underbelly (TV series), an Australian true crime drama television series, that borrows the title of the book series by journalists John Silvester and Andrew Rule and is primarily based on other works by the same authors:
 Underbelly (series 1), a 2008 Australian television drama mini-series and first in the franchise
 Underbelly: A Tale of Two Cities, a 2009 Australian drama mini-series prequel to the franchise
 Underbelly: The Golden Mile, a 2010 Australian drama mini-series prequel in succession to Tale
 Underbelly: Razor, a 2011 Australian drama mini-series, fourth in the franchise
 Underbelly: Badness, a 2012 Australian drama mini-series, fifth in the franchise
 Underbelly: Squizzy, a 2013 Australian drama mini-series, sixth in the franchise
 Underbelly Files, an Australian drama mini-series trilogy that continues the original Underbelly series. It consists of four 2-hour length telemovies titled:
 Tell Them Lucifer Was Here, a 2011 Australian made-for-television movie
 Infiltration, a 2011 Australian made-for-television movie
 The Man Who Got Away, a 2011 Australian made-for-television movie
Underbelly Files: Chopper a 2017 Australian mini-series
 Underbelly NZ: Land of the Long Green Cloud, a 2011 New Zealand spin-off of the Australian series
 Fat Tony & Co., an Australian true crime drama television series and the unbranded sequel to the first series

United States
 Notes from the Underbelly, an American television sitcom

Music 
 Underbelly (soundtrack)